This is the complete filmography of actress Beverly Tyler (July 5, 1927 – November 23, 2005).

Film and television appearances
 1961 Hazel - Phyllis Burkett - Everybody's Thankful But Us Turkeys 
 1961  The Andy Griffith Show - Gladys 'Melissa' Stevens - Barney on the Rebound
 1961  Bonanza - Mary - Vengeance 
 1960  Shotgun Slade - Peaches - Sudden Death
 1960  Tightrope - Valerie Harper - Park Avenue Story
 1959  Tales of Wells Fargo - Polly - Wanted: Jim Hardie
 1958-1959  The Lineup - Various Roles
 1959  Colonel Humphrey Flack - Peggy - Spaceship Ahoy 
 1959  Mike Hammer - The Last Aloha 
 1958  Bronco - Irene Lang - Quest of the Thirty Dead 
 1958  Hong Kong Confidential - Fay Wells 
 1958  The Toughest Gun in Tombstone - Della Cooper 
 1957  Chicago Confidential - Sylvia Clarkson 
 1957  Voodoo Island - Sarah Adams 
 1956  The Ford Television Theatre - Binnie Hughes - Lady in His Life
 1956  Death Valley Days - Evelyn Neilson - Escape
 1956  Damon Runyon Theater - Flower Brothertop - The Face of Johnny Dolliver
 1955  Climax! - The Bigger They Come
 1954  Shower of Stars - Lend an Ear
 1954  Big Town -  Lorelei Kilbourne 
 1954  Fireside Theatre - Beyond the Cross 
 1953  Schlitz Playhouse - The Girl That I Married  
 1952  Night Without Sleep - Singer (uncredited) 
 1952  Dangerous Assignment - Safiye - The Assassin Ring Story
 1952  The Battle at Apache Pass - Mary Kearney 
 1952  The Cimarron Kid - Carrie Roberts 
 1951  The Bigelow Theatre - His Brother's Keeper 
 1950  Musical Comedy Time - Sally Morgan - Whoopee 
 1950  The Fireball -  Mary Reeves 
 1950  The Palomino - Maria Guevara 
 1950  The Silver Theatre - My Brother's Keeper
 1950 Cavalcade of Stars - Herself
 1947  The Beginning or the End - Anne Cochran 
 1947  My Brother Talks to Horses - Martha Sterling 
 1946  The Green Years - Alison Keith as a Young Woman 
 1944  Bathing Beauty - Co-Ed (uncredited) 
 1943  Best Foot Forward - Miss Delaware Water Gap, Vocalist 
 1943  The Youngest Profession - Thyra Winter (Credited as Beverly Jean Saul)

References

Actress filmographies
American filmographies